Andrea Valderrama is a PeruvianAmerican politician who is currently the Oregon state representative in Oregon's 47th district. She was appointed to the seat after incumbent Democrat Diego Hernandez resigned. Prior to her time in the Oregon House of Representatives, she was the chair of the David Douglas School Board and a former staffer to Portland Mayor Ted Wheeler. On January 16, 2022, Valderrama was chosen as the Deputy Majority Whip in the House.

References

American politicians of Peruvian descent
Living people
Hispanic and Latino American state legislators in Oregon
Hispanic and Latino American women in politics
Democratic Party members of the Oregon House of Representatives
21st-century American politicians
Year of birth missing (living people)
21st-century American women politicians
Politicians from Portland, Oregon